The Orfalea College of Business is one of six colleges at California Polytechnic State University.

History

The college was first established in 1959 as a Business Department in the Sciences Division.  In 1962, the Business Department became part of the Applied Arts Division.  In 1970, it became part of the School of Business and Social Sciences, and the School of Business in 1977. Finally, it became the College of Business after 1992.  In 1987, the school became AACSB accredited for their master's program.  The building the school is currently housed in was opened in 1992.  In 2001, the college was named after Paul Orfalea, the founder of Kinko's, in recognition of his $15 million gift to the school.

Rankings 

In 2018, Payscale.com ranked the Cal Poly Business Administration Degree No. 8 in the Nation for return on investment. Forbes ranked Cal Poly California’s Best Public-Master’s University in 2018. Additionally, Cal Poly was named "Best in the West" for the 26th year in a row by U.S. News & World Report in 2018. ValueColleges.com ranked the Cal Poly M.S. Tax Program  No. 1 in the Nation for return on investment  and the Cal Poly Packaging Program No. 1 in the Nation in 2017. In 2016, Bloomberg Businessweek ranked the Orfalea College of Business No. 59 out of 114 colleges and universities in the annual list of top undergraduate business programs. In 2014, the publication also listed the undergraduate program as No. 5 in the nation for return on investment.

Undergraduate

Admissions 
For freshmen entering Fall 2019, the Orfalea College of Business accepted 28.8% of applicants (2,046 accepted/7,106 applied); entering freshmen had an average high school GPA of 4.00, an average ACT Composite score of 29.3, and an average SAT score of 1310 – 1460.

Fields of Study 
The Orfalea College of Business offers 3 majors, 4 minors, and 9 areas of  concentrations and options within the Business Administration and Economics Department. Freshmen students have until the end of their second year to declare their concentration and transfer students have until the end of their first year. Students can only declare one concentration but can add multiple minors offered throughout the university. Business Administration is the largest undergraduate major at Cal Poly with 2,414 undergraduate students in Fall 2019.
 Business Administration (AACSB Accredited)
 Economics (AACSB Accredited)
 Industrial Technology and Packaging (AACSB and ATMAE Accredited)

Areas of Concentration
 Accounting and Law
 Consumer Packaging 
 Entrepreneurship
 Financial Management
 Information Systems
 Management and Human Resources
 Marketing 
 Quantitative Analysis
 Real Estate Finance

Minors
 Accounting
 Economics
 Entrepreneurship
 Integrated Marketing Communications
 Industrial Technology
 Packaging
 Sales

Programs

Graduate

MBA 
The MBA degree requires 60 units of coursework. With approval, MBA students can also take another graduate program in parallel with their MBA program.

MS Accounting 
The MS in Accounting is a 45-quarter unit program.

MS Business Analytics 
The MS in Business Analytics is a 10-month program.

MS Packaging Value Chain 
The MS in Packaging Value Chain program is 100% online and can be completed in one year.

MS  Quantitative Economics 
The MS in Quantitative Economics is a one-year cohort program that starts with a fall intersession (August– September) followed by the fall, winter, and spring quarters with all classes on-campus.

MS Taxation 
The program includes a mandatory intensive session starting in August immediately before the fall quarter, as well as a winter internship. Cal Poly’s Master of Science in Taxation program was recently ranked No. 1 for value among graduate tax programs in the nation.

Professional Certificates

Business Analytics 
The Professional Certificate in Business Analytics is a part-time, interdisciplinary business certificate.

Packaging Value Chain 
The Orfalea College of Business offers five online professional Packaging Value Chain (PVC) certificate programs. The programs are all offered 100% online.

Cal Poly Center for Innovation and Entrepreneurship

Facilities

The four-story building is situated in front of the Richard O’Neill Green lawn.

See also
 California Polytechnic State University
 Business

References

Business schools in California
California Polytechnic State University
Educational institutions established in 1959
Universities and colleges in San Luis Obispo County, California
1959 establishments in California